Saint-Mesmin (Limousin: Sent Maimin) is a commune in the Dordogne department in Nouvelle-Aquitaine in southwestern France.

Geography
The commune is located in the north-east corner of the Dordogne department, on a hill above the river Auvézère. The area consists of forests and farmland.

History
From the creation of the departments in 1790 Saint-Mesmin was first included in the Corrèze department. Three years later in 1793 it joined the Dordogne department.

Population
The largest population that the census recorded was 1,168 in 1886. Since World War I, the population has gradually been declining.

Sights
The Auvézère has eroded a more than 100 meter deep gorge in limestone rock. There are footpaths through the gorge, offering access to the cascades.
Its maximum elevation is 415 m above sea level.

See also
Communes of the Dordogne department

References

External links

 Official site
 Moulin-Mesmin site

Communes of Dordogne
Arrondissement of Périgueux